The pound (sign: £; ISO code: GIP) is the currency of Gibraltar. It is pegged to – and exchangeable with – sterling at par value. Coins and banknotes of the Gibraltar pound are issued by the Government of Gibraltar.

History

Until 1872, the currency situation in Gibraltar was complicated, with a system based on the real being employed which encompassed British, Spanish and Gibraltarian coins. From 1825, the real (actually the Spanish real de plata) was tied to the pound at the rate of 1 Spanish dollar to 4 shillings 4 pence (equivalent to 21.67 pence today). In 1872, however, the Spanish currency became the sole legal tender in Gibraltar. In 1898, the Spanish–American War made the Spanish peseta drop alarmingly and the pound was introduced as the sole currency of Gibraltar, initially in the form of British coins and banknotes.

In 1898, sterling coin was made sole legal tender, although the Spanish peseta continued in circulation until the Spanish Civil War. Since 1927, Gibraltar has issued its own banknotes and, since 1988, its own coins. Gibraltar decimalised in 1971 at the same time as the UK, replacing the system of 1 pound = 20 shillings = 240 pence with one of 1 pound = 100 (new) pence.

Relationship with the British pound
The since repealed Currency Notes Act 1934, conferred on the Government of Gibraltar the right to print its own notes.

Notes issued are either backed by Bank of England notes at a rate of one to one, or can be backed by securities issued by the Government of Gibraltar. Although Gibraltar notes are denominated in "pounds sterling", they are not legal tender anywhere in the United Kingdom. Gibraltar's coins are the same weight, size and metal as British coins, although the designs are different, and they are occasionally found in circulation across Britain.

Under the Currency Notes Act 2011 the notes and coins issued by the Government of Gibraltar are legal tender and current coin within Gibraltar. British coins and Bank of England notes also circulate in Gibraltar and are universally accepted and interchangeable with Gibraltarian issues.

Coins

In 1988, coins in denominations of 1, 2, 5, 10, 20 and 50 pence and 1 pound were introduced which bore specific designs for and the name of Gibraltar. They were the same sizes and compositions as the corresponding British coins, with 2-pound coins introduced in 1999. A new coin of 5 pounds was issued in 2010 with the inscription "Elizabeth II · Queen of Gibraltar". This issue caused controversy in Spain, where the title of King of Gibraltar historically corresponds to the crown of Castile.

The £2 coin has featured a new design every year since its introduction, as it depicts each of the 12 Labours of Hercules.

Tercentenary edition

In 2004 the Government of Gibraltar minted a new edition of its coins to commemorate the tercentenary of British Gibraltar (1704-2004).

Banknotes
At the outbreak of World War I, Gibraltar was forced to issue banknotes to prevent paying out sterling or gold. These notes were issued under emergency wartime legislation, Ordinance 10 of 1914. At first, the typeset notes were signed by hand by Treasurer Greenwood, though he later used stamps. The notes bore the embossed stamp of the Anglo-Egyptian Bank Ltd. and circulated alongside British Territory notes. The 1914 notes were issued in denominations of 2/-, 10/-, £1, £5 and £50. The 2/- and £50 notes were not continued when a new series of notes was introduced in 1927. The 10/- note was replaced by the 50p coin during the process of decimalization. In 1975, £10 and £20 notes were introduced, followed by £50 in 1986. The £1 note was discontinued in 1988. In 1995, a new series of notes was introduced which, for the first time, bore the words "pounds sterling" rather than just "pounds". The government of Gibraltar introduced a new series of banknotes beginning with the £10 and £50 notes issued on July 8, 2010. On May 11, 2011, the £5, £20 and £100 notes were issued. In 2021, the government of Gibraltar introduced a new series of banknotes in a reduced size, closely matching that of the banknotes of the Bank of England. The first note, the £5 was issued into circulation in 2021.

See also
 Economy of Gibraltar
 Currency board
 Christopher Ironside, OBE, coin designer: reverse design of the 25 New Pence coin, Barbary ape (issued 1971).

References

Bibliography

External links

 Banknotes of Gibraltar: Catalog of Gibraltar Shillings and Pounds
 The current banknotes of Gibraltar 

Currencies of the British Empire
Currencies of the Commonwealth of Nations
Currencies of Gibraltar
Pound, Gibraltar
Currencies of British Overseas Territories
Fixed exchange rate
Currencies introduced in 1898